was a Japanese samurai of the Sengoku period. He was known as one of the "Twenty-Four Generals of Takeda Shingen".

He was most known for his participation in Sieges of Toishi where he together with Sanada Yukitaka fight Murakami Yoshikiyo. he reportedly put a fervent strong drill to his Spear soldier during the sieges, ordered them to consecutively perform a certain maneuver on battlefield, as such if a single line were to be formed with a depth of three-ranks, they would level their spear tips while advancing. however, despite the success of the siege he was killed in the battle

References

Further reading
 Stephen Turnbull. Ashigaru 1467-1649.

External links 
  "Legendary Takeda's 24 Generals" at Yamanashi-kankou.jp

Samurai
1487 births
1550 deaths
Takeda retainers